Srivilliputhur taluk is a taluk of Virudhunagar district of the Indian state of Tamil Nadu. The headquarters of the taluk is the town of Srivilliputhur.

Demographics
According to the 2011 census, the taluk of Srivilliputhur had a population of 292,895 with 145,763  males and 147,132 females. There were 1,009 women for every 1,000 men. The taluk had a literacy rate of 70.41%. Child population in the age group below 6 years were 13,150 Males and 12,615 Females.

References 

Taluks of Virudhunagar district